The men's bantamweight boxing competition at the 2000 Olympic Games in Sydney was held from 16 September to 30 September at the Sydney Convention and Exhibition Centre.

Competition format
Like all Olympic boxing events, the competition was a straight single-elimination tournament. This event consisted of 28 boxers who have qualified for the competition through various qualifying tournaments held in 1999 and 2000. The competition began with a preliminary round on 16 September, where the number of competitors was reduced to 16, and concluded with the final on 30 September. As there were fewer than 32 boxers in the competition, a number of boxers received a bye through the preliminary round. Both semi-final losers were awarded bronze medals.

All bouts consisted of four rounds of two minutes each, with one-minute breaks between rounds. Punches scored only if the white area on the front of the glove made full contact with the front of the head or torso of the opponent. Five judges scored each bout; three of the judges had to signal a scoring punch within one second for the punch to score. The winner of the bout was the boxer who scored the most valid punches by the end of the bout.

Competitors

Results
All times are Australian Time (UTC+10)

References

External links
 Official Olympic Report
 Official Results – Boxing
 Results on Amateur Boxing 

Boxing at the 2000 Summer Olympics